This was the first edition of the women's event.

Ekaterina Makarova and Linda Nosková won the title, defeating Anna Sisková and Maria Timofeeva in the final, 6–2, 6–3.

Seeds

Draw

Draw

References
Main Draw

Nur-Sultan International Tournament - Doubles